Abbé Félix Klein (12. July 1862 Château-Chinon – December 1953 Gargenville) was a French priest, theologian and author, who taught at the Institut Catholique de Paris. In the US, he is known as the author of the introduction of Comtesse de Ravilliax's French translation of Walter Elliott's Life of Father Hecker (1896), which started the Americanism controversy. Klein was made Chevalier of the Legion of Honour in 1952. Many of Abbé Klein's personal papers are kept in the University of Notre Dame Archives.

References

Literature 
Guy Thuillier, "Un Nivernais professeur à l’Institut catholique : l’abbé Félix Klein (1862-1953)", Mémoires de la Société académique du Nivernais, t. 73, 1993, p. 65- 75.

19th-century French Roman Catholic priests
20th-century French Catholic theologians
Catholic Church in the United States
Recipients of the Legion of Honour
1862 births
1953 deaths
French male writers